Counting sheep is a way to fall asleep

Counting Sheep may also refer to:

Counting Sheep (album) children's album 2000, by American country music artist Collin Raye
"Counting Sheep" (Safia song)
"Counting Sheep", song by Lower Than Atlantis Changing Tune
"Counting Sheep", song by Atlantis, 1991
"Counting Sheep", song by Dragon, 1979
"Counting Sheep", song by Dune Rats from The Kids Will Know It's Bullshit, 2017
"Counting Sheep", song by Jan Rot, 1982
"Counting Sheep", song by The JudyBats from Native Son, 1991
"Counting Sheep", song by Glass Cloud from The Royal Thousand
"Counting Sheep", song by The Lemon Bucket Orkestra
"Counting Sheep Around the World", Crystal Gayle's album dedicated solely to children's music In My Arms 2000